Antun "Tone" Hočevar (born April 4, 1951, in Ljubljana) is a Yugoslav retired slalom canoeist who competed from the late 1960s to the mid-1970s. He finished 14th in the C-1 event at the 1972 Summer Olympics in Munich.

References
 Sports-reference.com profile

1951 births
Canoeists at the 1972 Summer Olympics
Living people
Olympic canoeists of Yugoslavia
Yugoslav male canoeists
Slovenian male canoeists
Sportspeople from Ljubljana